This is a list of mosques in Azerbaijan.

See also
 List of mosques in Nagorno-Karabakh
 List of mosques in Asia

External links

 
Azerbaijan
Mosques